The following is a list of mayors in the Colombian municipality of Barrancas, La Guajira.

 Elected by popular vote

See also

List of Governors of the Department of La Guajira

References

External links
 Mayors of Barrancas

Politics of Barrancas, La Guajira